Vishva Vijay Shinde (born 11 July 2003) is an Indian professional footballer who plays as a forward for I-League club Indian Arrows.

Club career
Born in Kolhapur, Maharashtra, Shinde began his career playing in local football tournaments in his town and within the state as well.

Indian Arrows
Prior to the 2020–21 season, Shinde was announced as part of the squad for I-League side Indian Arrows, the development team for the All India Football Federation. He made his professional debut for the club on 29 January 2021 against Chennai City, coming on as an 83rd-minute substitute as Indian Arrows lost 1–0.

International career
Shinde has represented India at the under-16 level.

Career statistics

References

External links
 Profile at the All India Football Federation

2003 births
Living people
People from Kolhapur
Indian footballers
Association football forwards
Indian Arrows players
I-League players
Footballers from Maharashtra
India youth international footballers